Pike Township is one of the ten townships of Clark County, Ohio, United States. The 2010 census reported 3,730 people living in the township, 3,246 of whom lived in the unincorporated portions of the township.

Geography
Located in the northwestern corner of the county, it borders the following townships:
Jackson Township, Champaign County - north
Mad River Township, Champaign County - northeast corner
German Township - east
Bethel Township - south
Bethel Township, Miami County - southwest
Elizabeth Township, Miami County - west
Lostcreek Township, Miami County - northwest corner

Part of the city of New Carlisle is located in southwestern Pike Township, and the village of North Hampton is located in the east.

Name and history
Pike Township was formed in 1818.

It is one of eight Pike Townships statewide.

Government
The township is governed by a three-member board of trustees, who are elected in November of odd-numbered years to a four-year term beginning on the following January 1. Two are elected in the year after the presidential election and one is elected in the year before it. There is also an elected township fiscal officer, who serves a four-year term beginning on April 1 of the year after the election, which is held in November of the year before the presidential election. Vacancies in the fiscal officership or on the board of trustees are filled by the remaining trustees.

References

External links
County website

Townships in Clark County, Ohio
Townships in Ohio
1818 establishments in Ohio
Populated places established in 1818